This is Who You Are is the second and final full-length album from The Beautiful Mistake released in 2004.

This Is Who You Are peaked at #49 on the Billboard Top Heatseekers chart, and #22 on the Billboard Top Independent chart.

Track listing 
"This is Who You Are" - 3:52
"Wide Eyed and Wasted" - 3:47
"My Reminder" - 3:50
"Cold Hearts (For Tired Souls)" - 3:12
"A Safe Place" - 2:52
"The Separation" - 3:24
"The Great Divorce" - 3:37
"Walking Wounded" - 2:36
"A Friendly Committee" - 2:07
"Cold Hands" - 8:02 §

§ There are several misprints on the album artwork regarding the final track.  On the back cover it lists the track as "Cold Hands (For Tired Hearts)".  On the lyric page for the track, it's listed as "Cold Hands (For Dying Hearts)". In the lyric book, the song is listed as track 9, while the real track 9 is listed as 10.

References 

2004 albums
The Beautiful Mistake albums